Formosa Taishin Dreamers (Chinese: 福爾摩沙台新夢想家) is a professional basketball team based in Changhua and Taichung, Taiwan. They have been part of the ASEAN Basketball League since the 2017–18 season. The Dreamers are one of the two teams from Taiwan that participated in the 2019–20 season after the Kaohsiung Truth basketball team was replaced.  

Formosa Dreamers were founded by Chang Cheng-chung, Chris Hsu, Jimmy Chang, Blackie Chen and Jonathan Han, all of whom have different professions from various industries.

Facilities

Home arenas

Training facilities
The Dreamers previously practiced at the Jhang Bei Civil Sports Center.

Roster

Notable players

Season-by-season record

References

External links
 
  
  
 

 
ASEAN Basketball League teams
P. League+ teams
2017 establishments in Taiwan
basketball teams established in 2017
Sport in Taichung
Sport in Changhua